This is a list of Swiss football transfers in the 2016 summer transfer window by club. Only clubs in the 2016–17 Swiss Super League are included.

Swiss Super League

Basel

In:

Out:

Grasshopper

In:

Out:

Lausanne

In:

Out:

Lugano

In:

Out:

Luzern

In:

Out:

Sion

In:

Out:

St. Gallen

In:

Out:

Thun

In:

Out:

Vaduz

In:

Out:

Young Boys

In:

Out:

References

Transfers
Switzerland
2016